While at War is a 2019 Spanish-Argentine historical drama film directed by Alejandro Amenábar. Set in 1936, during the Spanish Civil War, the plot tracks the plight of philosopher and writer Miguel de Unamuno (performed by Karra Elejalde) in Salamanca, a city controlled by the Rebel faction.

Plot

During the Spanish coup of July 1936, Nationalist troops occupy Salamanca. In the process, the city's Socialist mayor is arrested. Revered author Miguel de Unamuno (Karra Elejalde) convenes with two colleagues, Protestant priest Atilano Coco Martin and leftist Salvador Vila Hernández; they discuss the coup briefly, after which Unamuno leaves for an interview to publicly support the coup. During the interview, the mayor's wife interrupts to ask him to intervene regarding her husband's imprisonment; Unamuno offers monetary assistance instead, which she rejects.

Meanwhile, in Spanish Morocco, a German delegation meets with General Francisco Franco to pressure the formation of a single Nationalist leader following the death of General José Sanjurjo. Franco maintains that the junta in Burgos holds power, even as his colleagues pressure him to take leadership. Back in Salamanca, Unamuno is removed from his position as rector at the University of Salamanca by the government of the Second Spanish Republic in response to his support of the coup. Unamuno meets with Coco and Salvador again, with the meeting culminating in a heated argument from which Coco leaves. Unamuno later goes to Coco's residence to speak with him, only to find that he is not there. Elsewhere, General José Millán-Astray meets with Franco in Cáceres, while the junta in Burgos reinstates Unamuno as rector of the university, where he finds that he has been prompted to write a manifesto supporting the coup, a task he rejects. Unamuno attempts to meet with Coco - his wife reveals that he had been taken into Nationalist custody days prior. Unamuno meets with Salvador, who attempts to convince him of the fascist nature of the coup.

Meanwhile, Millán-Astray urges Franco to relieve the Siege of the Alcázar in Toledo, but is rebuffed on strategic grounds – to relieve the siege would delay the war's end by years. Millán-Astray pressures Franco to assume leadership, a proposal Franco once again rejects. Later, Franco replaces the Republic's flag on his headquarters with the old monarchist flag, stirring discontent within the junta. The junta then arrive in Salamanca to meet with Franco and his generals, with whom Unamuno is called to meet. Unamuno attempts to plead for Coco's release, and is told that his case will be reviewed. Unamuno is then quietly confronted by Millán-Astray about his unwillingness to sign the manifesto, leaving Unamuno to make a decision. The junta leave to hold a vote on the leadership question, during which Millán-Astray exhorts his colleagues to vote for Franco. At the same time, the administration of the University of Salamanca meet regarding the manifesto. Unamuno assents and signs, while Franco is voted in as commander-in-chief. While leaving the meeting, Unamuno is met by Coco's wife, who presents him a letter testifying to her husband's innocence. Meanwhile, Franco visits a cathedral, where he is inspired by an image of El Cid to relieve the siege of the Alcázar, earning more fervor for his cause.

Unamuno meets with Salvador in the countryside, with whom he debates with regarding the war. During the walk back, Salvador is accosted and arrested by Falangists, leaving Unamuno to walk back alone in the rain. He slips into a delirious state for several days, after which he attempts to make a personal appeal to Franco and his wife to have his colleagues released; the attempt fails, and Unamuno, anguished, informs Coco's wife. Meanwhile, Millán-Astray confronts Unamuno once again and informs him that he will be taking Franco's place in a Nationalist event at the university the following day. At the event, Unamuno initially refuses to speak, though he changes his mind after reading Coco's wife's letter. He presents a speech criticizing the nationalists, causing the crowd to turn on him, thereby forcing him out. An epilogue details the fates of several of the figures in the film.

Cast

Release
The film had its world premiere on September 6, 2019 at the Toronto International Film Festival. The film was also included in the Official Section of the 2019 San Sebastián International Film Festival.

Distributed by Walt Disney Studios Motion Pictures through their Buena Vista International distribution label, the film was released in cinemas in Spain on September 27, 2019.

Millán-Astray controversy
The Plataforma Patriótica Millán-Astray (Millán-Astray Patriotic Plataform), an organization of veterans of the Spanish Legion, accused the script writers of plagiarism of the 1941 work Unamuno's Last Lecture by Luis Portillo, a text the organization claims is defamatory towards José Millán-Astray, founder of the Spanish Legion. The accusation was based on the content of the official trailers. The organization demanded the return of the public funds received for the making of the film.

Reception
On Metacritic, the film has a score of 55 out of 100, based on 4 critics, indicating "mixed or average reviews".

Dennis Harvey of Variety gave it a mixed review and wrote: "This is a worthy enterprise that errs on the side of caution, carrying the slightly stale whiff of awards-bait cinema in which greatness is frequently signaled but inspiration somehow lacking."
Jonathan Holland of The Hollywood Reporter called it "Ambitious in scope, carefully crafted and featuring several fine performances" but was in the final impression felt that the film  had been limited by its faithfulness to the book.

Accolades 

|-
| align = "center" rowspan = "44" | 2020 || rowspan = "2" | 25th Forqué Awards || colspan = "2" | Best Film ||  || rowspan = "2" | 
|-
| Best Actor || Karra Elejalde || 
|-
| rowspan = "4"  | 7th Feroz Awards || Best Actor (film) || Karra Elejalde ||  || rowspan = "4" | 
|-
| Best Supporting Actor (film) || Eduard Fernández ||  
|-
| Best Original Score || Alejandro Amenábar || 
|-
| Best Trailer || Rafa Martínez || 
|-
| rowspan = "2" | 12th Gaudí Awards || Best Actor || Karra Elejalde ||  || rowspan = "2" | 
|-
| Best Supporting Actor || Eduard Fernández || 
|-
| rowspan = "8" | 75th CEC Medals || colspan = "2" | Best Film ||  || rowspan = "8" | 
|-
| Best Director || Alejandro Amenábar || 
|-
| Best Actor || Karra Elejalde || 
|-
| Best Supporting Actor || Eduard Fernández || 
|-
| Best New Actor || Santi Prego || 
|-
| Best Original Screenplay || Alejandro Amenábar, Alejandro Hernández || 
|-
| Best Cinematography || Alex Catalán || 
|-
| Best Editing || Carolina Martínez Urbina || 
|-
| rowspan = "17" | 34th Goya Awards || colspan = "2" | Best Film ||  || rowspan = "17" | 
|-
| Best Director || Alejandro Amenábar || 
|-
| Best Actor || Karra Elejalde || 
|-
| Best Supporting Actor || Eduard Fernández || 
|-
| Best Supporting Actress ||Nathalie Poza || 
|-
| Best New Actor || Santi Prego || 
|-
| Best New Actress || Ainhoa Santamaría || 
|-
| Best Original Screenplay || Alejandro Amenábar, Alejandro Hernández || 
|-
| Best Cinematography || Alex Catalán || 
|-
| Best Editing || Carolina Martínez Urbina || 
|-
| Best Art Direction || Juan Pedro de Gaspar || 
|-
| Best Production Supervision || Carla Pérez de Álbeniz || 
|-
| Best Sound || Aitor Berenguer, Gabriel Gutiérrez || 
|-
| Best Special Effects || Raúl Romanillos, Juanma Nogales || 
|-
| Best Costume Design || Sonia Grande || 
|-
| Best Makeup and Hairstyles || Ana López-Puigcerver, Belén López-Puigcerver and Nacho Díaz || 
|-
| Best Original Score || Alejandro Amenábar || 
|-
| rowspan = "4" | 29th Actors and Actresses Union Awards || Best Film Actor in a Leading Role || Karra Elejalde ||  || rowspan = "4" | 
|-
| rowspan = "2" | Best Film Actress in a Secondary Role || Nathalie Poza || 
|-
| Inma Cuevas || 
|-
| Best Film Actor in a Secondary Role || Eduard Fernández || 
|-
| rowspan = "7" | 7th Platino Awards || Best Director || Alejandro Amenábar ||  || rowspan = "7" | 
|-
| Best Actor (film) || Karra Elejalde || 
|-
| Best Screenplay || Alejandro Amenábar, Alejandro Hernández || 
|-
| Best Original Score || Alejandro Amenábar ||  
|-
| Best Cinematography || Alex Catalán || 
|-
| Best Art Direction || Juan Pedro de Gaspar || 
|-
| Best Sound || Aitor Berenguer, Gabriel Gutiérrez || 
|}

See also 
 List of Spanish films of 2019
 List of Argentine films of 2019

References

External links
 

2010s historical drama films
2019 war drama films
2019 drama films
2019 films
Argentine historical drama films
Argentine war drama films
Films about Francisco Franco
Films about military personnel
Films about writers
Films directed by Alejandro Amenábar
Films involved in plagiarism controversies
Films set in 1936
Films set in Morocco
Films set in Spain
Films set in the 1930s
Spanish Civil War films
Spanish historical drama films
Spanish war drama films
2010s Spanish-language films
Films about coups d'état
Buena Vista International films
MOD Producciones films
Films shot in the province of Salamanca
2010s Spanish films
2010s Argentine films